Gondwana Kingdom was the ruling kingdom in Gondwana region of India. The Gondwana region includes core region of eastern part of the Vidarbha of Maharashtra, Garha Kingdom the parts of Madhya Pradesh immediately to the north of it, and parts of the west of Chhattisgarh. The wider region extends beyond these, also including parts of northern Telangana, western Odisha and southern Uttar Pradesh.

The Gondwana Kingdom was ruled by Rajgonds. The Rajgonds are the ruling class among the Gond. The Gond is the dominating Community  in Gondwana region. The name Gondwana named after Gondi people.

Gonds are followers of the nature-based religion Gondi Religion/Koyapunem.

Gondwana means "Country inhabited by Gonds".

In the early period, Gondwana kingdom consisted of majorly four kingdoms- The Northern Gondwana was Garha Katanga or Garha Mandla Kingdom of Jabalpur and Southern part was Chanda Kingdom of Chandrapur. The western past was Kherla Kingdom of Betul and in 16th century Deogarh Kingdom of Nagpur and Chhindwara emerged as a strong kingdom.

The Gonds were first mentioned in 14th-century Muslim chronicles. From the 14th to the 18th century the area was held by powerful Gond dynasties, which during Mughal times remained independent or served as tributary chiefs. When in the 18th century the Gonds were conquered by the Marathas, the greater part of Gondwana was incorporated into the dominions of the Bhonsle rajas of Nagpur or the nizams of Hyderabad. Many Gonds took refuge in relatively inaccessible highlands and became tribal raiders. Between 1818 and 1853 the greater part of the region passed to the British, although in some minor states the Gond rajas continued to rule until Indian independence in 1947.

The Gondwana express train runs between Raigarh and Hazrat Nizamuddin in India. It is a five-day service. It operates as train number 12409 from Raigarh to Hazrat Nizamuddin and as train number 12410 in the reverse direction after the name of Gondwana kingdom.

Emblem of Gondwana State
For over a millennium in South Asia, the visual trope of a triumphant lion vanquishing one or several elephants has been common in architectural sculpture, both in the round and in relief. In the rather limited scholarship on this motif, diverse interpretations have been offered. Although its presence has remained fairly stable through time, there exist many minor variations on this motif, including the use of leonine creatures variously described as vyālas or yālīs, and the incorporation of other fantastic creatures known popularly as makaras in such combats.In South India, the myth of the fantastic composite animal called the Śarabha takes this imagery yet further. Yet, the simple image of a lion victorious over one or more elephants was situated very strategically within certain architectural programs for given periods and places.For example, Gondwana Kingdom forts,Deccani forts constructed between the fifteenth and seventeenth centuries carried this representation on their barbicans and gateways . While tracing the history of this visual motif.

History

Deogad-Nagpur Kingdom 

The second kingdom of Deogad (Chhindwada in Madhya Pradesh and Nagpur in Maharashtra), was created by King Jatba in the 15th century. One of his successors, Bakht Buland Shah, converted to Islam to win the favour of emperor Aurangzeb. However, he did not demand conversion from his subjects and married a Gond woman. He fell into disfavour in Delhi after he plundered some Muslim kingdoms of Deccan. The city of Nagpur was founded by the king of Deogad Raja Bakht Buland Shah in 1702. The kingdom of Nagpur and later came under the rule of the Nagpur Bhonsles.

Chanda Kingdom 

The 10th ruler of the Gond dynasty of Chanda, Khadkya Ballal Shah (1472 -1497 CE), who made Chandrapur his capital. The Chanda kingdom (Chandrapur in Maharashtra), a contemporary of the Kherla and Deogadh kingdoms, produced several remarkable rulers who developed excellent irrigation systems and the first well defined revenue system among the Gond kingdoms.

See also 
 Rani Kamlapati, a Gond queen

References

External links
 Kings of Gondwana
 Sangram Shah had issued some square coins.
 

4th century BC in India
History of Maharashtra
History of Madhya Pradesh
History of Chhattisgarh
History of Telangana
History of Odisha
History of Uttar Pradesh